

This page lists board and card games, wargames, miniatures games, and tabletop role-playing games published in 1996.  For video games, see 1996 in video gaming.

Games released or invented in 1996

Game awards given in 1996
Origins Awards (for 1995):
Best Card Game: Middle-earth: The Wizards
Best Fantasy or Science-Fiction Board Game: Dragon Dice
Best Graphic Presentation of a Board Game: RoboRally - Armed and Dangerous
Best Miniatures Rules: Warzone - A Fast & Furious Miniatures Battle Game
Best Modern-Day Board Game: Empire of the Rising Sun
Best Pre-20th Century Board Game (tie): Colonial Diplomacy, Three Days of Gettysburg
Best Roleplaying Rules: Mage: The Ascension (2nd edition)
 Adventure Gaming Hall of Fame
Axis & Allies
Call of Cthulhu RPG
 Games: 25 Words or Less

Significant games-related events of 1996
Five Rings Publishing Group formed as a spin-out of Alderac Entertainment Group and ISOMEDIA.
Looney Labs is founded after the demise of Icehouse Games, Inc.

See also
 1996 in video gaming

Games
Games by year